Kirby is an unincorporated census-designated place in northern Pike County, Arkansas, United States. The community lies on U.S. Route 70; it is located halfway between Daisy and Glenwood. Per the 2020 census, the population was 721.

Education 
Public education for elementary and secondary school students is provided by the Kirby School District, which includes:

 Kirby Elementary School, serving kindergarten through grade 6.
 Kirby High School, serving grades 7 through 12.

The schools' mascot and athletic teams are the Trojans with maroon and gray as the school colors.

Demographics

2020 census

Note: the US Census treats Hispanic/Latino as an ethnic category. This table excludes Latinos from the racial categories and assigns them to a separate category. Hispanics/Latinos can be of any race.

References

Census-designated places in Arkansas
Census-designated places in Pike County, Arkansas